Batagay Airport  is an airport serving the urban locality of Batagay, Verkhoyansky District, in the Sakha Republic of Russia, ashore the Yana River.

Airlines and destinations

External links

References

  

Airports built in the Soviet Union
Airports in the Arctic
Airports in the Sakha Republic